Two ships of the United States Navy have been named USS Stribling for Cornelius Stribling.

United States Navy ship names